David Gold is an American conservative talk radio host. Gold, who has been a talk radio host since the mid-1970s, one of the first U.S. conservative talk radio hosts. His philosophy has been characterized as in the conservative/libertarian vein.

Broadcasting career
Gold has worked as a local talk host in markets such as Boston, Denver, Tampa, Miami and Dallas.

Gold began his career at KWBZ Radio in Denver, a powerful talk radio station the country's 22nd largest radio market, where he worked alongside legendary host Alan Berg. Then, during the mid-1980s, Gold moved to Tampa, Florida, where he became that city's first conservative talk host on WPLP-AM. Gold then moved to Miami to do a talk show before heading west to Dallas, where he would find the most success hosting local talk radio programs.

Along with his friend Kevin McCarthy, Gold was one of the top hosts at KLIF, the first full-time talk radio station in the fifth-biggest U.S. radio market. Unusual for a radio station, the station became prominent in the city's mediascape. Its hosts were often quoted in local media and amongst local politicians. Gold was a staple at KLIF, where he ruled the afternoon "drive time" show from 1986 to 1997.

Current radio work
Gold most recently hosted an afternoon show at KSFO (AM) in San Francisco. His voice has often been heard as a fill-in host at stations in markets such as Tampa and Seattle.

Other media work
Gold has been asked to present his opinion as a guest on numerous programs including Nightline, Crossfire and Good Morning America. Gold co-hosted a weekly debate on the Dallas NBC Affiliate, KXAS-TV.

Quotes
One Dallas publication described Gold's influence in Dallas media:

References

External links
 Gold's official Web site
 Biography of Gold's career.

Year of birth missing (living people)
Living people
American talk radio hosts
American libertarians
American political commentators